The 1927 Cork Intermediate Hurling Championship was the 18th staging of the Cork Intermediate Hurling Championship since its establishment by the Cork County Board.

Fr. Matthew Hall won the championship on the field of play following a 3-3 to 1-1 defeat of Cobh in the final, however, an objection by Cobh was upheld and the result was reversed. As a result of this, Cobh became the first team to win a second title. It was their first championship since 1916.

Results

Final

References

Cork Intermediate Hurling Championship
Cork Intermediate Hurling Championship